Shamratovo (Şamrat) is a rural locality (a village) in Novoberdyashsky Selsoviet, Karaidelsky District, Bashkortostan, Russia. The population was 283 as of 2010. There are 7 streets.

Geography 
Shamratovo is located 48 km southeast of Karaidel (the district's administrative centre) by road. Kanton is the nearest rural locality.

References 

Rural localities in Karaidelsky District